István Ágh may refer to:

 István Agh (1709–1786), Hungarian Unitarian bishop
 István Ágh (poet) (born 1938), Hungarian poet
 István Ágh (sport shooter) (born 1970), Hungarian sport shooter